The 40th National Basketball Association All-Star Game was played on February 11, 1990, at Miami Arena in Miami. Magic Johnson was named the game's MVP as well as the leading scorer with 22 points.

The Eastern Conference All-Star Starters as selected by fan voting were Michael Jordan, Isiah Thomas, Charles Barkley, Larry Bird, and Patrick Ewing. The reserves consisted of Celtics Duo Kevin McHale and Robert Parish, as well as, Dominique Wilkins of the Atlanta Hawks. The reserves were rounded out by four first time all-stars; Scottie Pippen of the Chicago Bulls, Indiana Pacers guard Reggie Miller, and Detroit Piston teammates Joe Dumars and Dennis Rodman.

The Western Conference All-Star Starters as selected by fan voting were John Stockton, Magic Johnson, James Worthy, A.C. Green, and  Akeem Olajuwon. The reserves consisted of Clyde Drexler from the Blazers, Phoenix Suns teammates Tom Chambers and Kevin Johnson, as well as Chris Mullin of the Golden State Warriors. The team was rounded out by San Antonio center David Robinson, Denver Nuggets guard Lafayette Lever and Utah Jazz forward Karl Malone. Rolando Blackman was later named to the team as injury replacement for Karl Malone. A.C. Green, David Robinson, and Kevin Johnson were all making their first All-Star Game appearance

Coaches: East: Chuck Daly, West: Pat Riley.  This was the first of four consecutive All-Star Games in which the coaches of the previous year's NBA Finals were the head coaches of the All-Star Game. 

The game featured 11 out of 12 players that would go on to make the 1992 Dream Team as well as coach Chuck Daly.

Magic Johnson was the game MVP as well as leading scorer with 22 points. Akeem Olajuwon led the way with a game high 16 rebounds, and Isiah Thomas had the most assists on the night with 9.

This was the last NBA All-Star Game broadcast by CBS before moving to NBC in the following year.

All-Star voting
All-Star Starters

Eastern Conference voting

Western Conference voting

Michael Jordan was the leading vote-getter overall. Magic Johnson received the most votes among Western Conference players.

Rosters

Karl Malone was unable to play due to injury. Rolando Blackman was selected as his replacement.

Score by periods
 

Halftime— East, 65–52
Third Quarter— East, 100–83
Officials: Earl Strom, Bill Oakes, and Paul Mihalak
Attendance: 14,810

NBA All-Star legends Game
For the 7th straight year this contest featured stars from the East including Elvin Hayes, Wali Jones,  Bobby Jones, Connie Hawkins, Cazzie Russell, Dave DeBusschere, Walt Hazzard, Zelmo Beaty and  Archie Clark
For the West this team featured Rick Barry, Calvin Murphy,  Doug Collins,  Fred Brown, Dave Bing, Jamaal Wilkes, Spencer Haywood, Bailey Howell, Clifford Ray, and Dave Cowens.

References

National Basketball Association All-Star Game
All-Star
GMA Network television specials